The 1972 Perth Carnival was the 18th edition of the Australian National Football Carnival, an Australian football interstate competition. It was the last of the traditional single-city round-robin carnivals in the residential qualification era of interstate football.

Four teams took part, Victoria, Western Australia, South Australia and Tasmania, with each playing one another once in a round robin format. Victoria won the Carnival after finishing as the only undefeated team.

Peter McKenna was the most successful goal kicker with 19 goals, followed by Glynn Hewitt and Phil Tierney who kicked 11 each.

Squads

Victoria

Western Australia

South Australia

Tasmania

Results

All-Australian team
In 1972 the All-Australian team was picked based on the Perth Carnival.

Tassie Medal
Ken McAullay of Western Australia won the Tassie Medal with 17 votes, eight more than the runner-up Len Thompson received.

References
1972 Perth Carnival page on Fullpointsfooty

Australian rules interstate football
Perth Carnival